Kolanı (also, Kelan’, Kelany, and Kolany) is a village in the Siazan Rayon of Azerbaijan.  The village forms part of the municipality of Yenikənd.

References 

Populated places in Siyazan District